John Yeardley (3 January 1786 – 11 August 1858) was a Quaker missionary.

He was the son of Joel and Frances Yeardley, small dairy farmers at Orgreave, near Rotherham, Yorkshire. John was admitted a member of the Society of Friends in his twentieth year, entered a manufactory in Barnsley, and married, in 1809, Elizabeth Dunn, a convinced Friend much his senior. He commenced preaching in 1815, moving from place to place in the northern counties.

In 1821 Yeardley's wife died, and, led by a persistent "call," he decided to settle at Pyrmont in Germany, where a small body of Friends existed. For his subsistence he arranged to represent some merchants who imported linen yarn, and later on he commenced bleaching on his own account. His philanthropic labours included the establishing of schools and meetings for the young, and many notable persons, including the prince and princess of Prussia, came to hear him preach. In 1824 he accompanied Martha Savory, an English Quaker, on a gospel journey up the Rhine from Elberfeld to Württemberg, Tübingen, and other German towns, through Switzerland to Congénies in Central France, where some Friends were and (as of 1897) still are settled. They visited Theodor Fliedner at Kaiserswerth, and all the principal religious and philanthropic institutions on their route.

Upon reaching England they were married at Gracechurch Street meeting on 13 December 1826, resuming soon after their missionary labours in Pyrmont, Friesland, and Switzerland, and visiting asylums, reformatories, and Moravian schools.

During a short time spent in England both Yeardley and his wife applied themselves to the study of modern Greek in preparation for a visit to the isles, for which they started on 21 June 1833. They were warmly received by Edmond de Pressensé in Paris, and by Professors Ehrmann and Frédéric Cuvier at Strasbourg. In Corfu they established a girls' school, also a model farm, obtaining from the authorities there a grant of land upon which prisoners were permitted to supply the labour.

After eight years at home, spent in studying languages, the Yeardleys in 1842 returned for the fourth time to France and Germany. In 1850, during a stay in Berlin, they became acquainted with August Neander. Mrs. Yeardley died on 8 May 1851, but her husband continued his travels to Norway in 1852, and to South Russia and Constantinople in 1853.

In his seventy-second year he commenced to study Turkish, and started for the East on 15 June 1858. After some work in Constantinople, and while waiting for his equipments and tents to proceed to the interior of Asia Minor, Yeardley was smitten with paralysis at Isnik, and was compelled to return to England, where he died on 11 August 1858. He was buried at Stoke Newington on the 18th.

As a preacher Yeardley's racy humour, with occasional lapses into his broad native Barnsley dialect, added to his uncompromising directness, did him good service. As a linguist his achievements in preaching without interpreters were remarkable, considering that his early education included no Latin.

He used tracts largely as a vehicle for spreading the gospel. These, written and sometimes translated by himself, were founded upon incidents and characters met with during his travels. They are catalogued by Smith.

Works
His second wife, Martha Yeardley, born on 8 March 1781, was daughter of Joseph and Anna Savory, and both before and after her marriage was author of several works in verse and prose, the chief of which are
Inspiration, London, 1805, 8vo.
Poetical Tales founded on Facts, London, 1808, 12mo; reissued with a new title, Pathetic Tales, 1813.
Life's Vicissitudes, London, 1809, 8vo.
A Wreath of Forget-me-not, [1829].
Conversations between a Governess and her Pupils, London, n.d.
Questions on the Gospels, London, n.d.
Poetical Sketches of Scripture Characters, London, 1848, 12mo.
True Tales from Foreign Lands, n.d.
She also joined her husband in writing:
A Brief Memoir of Mary Ann Calame, with some account of the Institution at Locle, Switzerland, London, 1835, 12mo.
Eastern Customs illustrative of Scripture, London, 1842, 12mo
The manuscript diary of their Greek journey was, in 1900, at Devonshire House
Extracts from the Letters of J. and M. Yeardley, from the continent, was published at Lindfield, 1835, 8vo.

References

External links
 
 

1786 births
1858 deaths
Quaker missionaries
English Quakers
People from Rotherham
English religious writers
English male non-fiction writers
English Protestant missionaries
Protestant missionaries in Russia
Protestant missionaries in Turkey
Protestant missionaries in Switzerland
Protestant missionaries in the Netherlands
Protestant missionaries in Greece
Protestant missionaries in the Ottoman Empire